Yongcheng North railway station is a railway station of Zhengzhou–Xuzhou High-Speed Railway in Mangshan Town, Yongcheng, Shangqiu, Henan, China. The station started operation on 10 September 2016, together with the railway.

References

Buildings and structures in Henan
Railway stations in Henan
Stations on the Xuzhou–Lanzhou High-Speed Railway
Railway stations in China opened in 2016
Shangqiu